Boletus barragensis is a species of bolete fungus in the family Boletaceae native to Australia. It was first reported as form of Boletus luridus in 1934 by John Burton Cleland, before being described by Cheryl Grgurinovic in 1997.

See also
 List of Boletus species

References

External links

barragensis
Fungi described in 1997
Fungi native to Australia
Taxa named by Cheryl A. Grgurinovic